Amasya Eğitim Spor is a women's association football club based in Amasya, Turkey. After finishing the 2015–16 season in the Turkish Women's Second Football League as the runners-up, they were promoted to play in the Women's First League. The team did not show up at any league match of the 2016–17 season, and so were relegated to the Second League.

Stadium
Amasya Eğitim Spor play their home matches at 12 Haziran Stadium (literally: June 12 Stadium) located in the center of Amasya as the city's only stadium. In 1967 built and fully restored between 2012 and 2014, the venue features a natural grass surface and has a seating capacity of 12,000.

Statistics
.

References

Association football clubs established in 2011
2011 establishments in Turkey
Women's football clubs in Turkey
Sport in Amasya